Tzafririm is a moshav in central Israel. Located near Beit Shemesh, it falls under the jurisdiction of Mateh Yehuda Regional Council.

History
The village was established in 1958 by immigrants from Morocco, Iran, Iraq and India on land that had belonged to the depopulated Palestinian village of 'Ajjur.

Notable residents
 Aarele Ben Arieh (Israeli artist)

Gallery

References

1958 establishments in Israel
Indian-Jewish culture in Israel
Iranian-Jewish culture in Israel
Iraqi-Jewish culture in Israel
Moshavim
Moroccan-Jewish culture in Israel
Populated places established in 1958
Populated places in Jerusalem District